Kashk (also Romanized as Kāshk) is a village in Tabas Rural District, in the Central District of Khoshab County, Razavi Khorasan Province, Iran. At the 2006 census, its population was 141, in 49 families. Further, it is the region in which Kashk Hendessi found its recipes centuries ago.

References 

Populated places in Khoshab County